Société de transport de l'Outaouais (STO) is the transit service of the Outaouais region of Quebec. It operates conventional services and the Rapibus, a bus rapid transit service, in Gatineau, Quebec, including the districts of Hull, Aylmer, Gatineau, Buckingham and Masson-Angers. STO provided limited service to Chelsea and Cantley until June 2015 when Transcollines began operations in the Collines de l'Outaouais MRC. STO is located on the Quebec-side of Canada's National Capital Region, and operates several bus routes through Downtown Ottawa, Ontario.

History
Prior to 1971, public transportation in Gatineau was operated by private sector companies. In 1971, these companies had a total of 42 buses and 2.5 million clients. This same year, the Commission de transport de la communauté régionale de l'Outaouais (CTCRO) was created to improve regional transportation services that would otherwise exceed the means of the constituent cities.

In 1972, for $6.25 million, CTCRO purchased 8 private transit companies in the region: Transport urbain de Hull, Transport Hull métropolitain, Transport d'écoliers du nord de l'Outaouais. A year later, the CTCRO created an agreement with OC Transpo to make transfers between the two services easier.

It purchased only air-conditioned buses from its first one, 1990. In 1991, it changed its name to Société de transport de l'Outaouais (STO)

In 1998, the STO was named the "Canadian public transit operator of the year" by the Canadian Urban Transit Association (CUTA). From 1999 to 2001, to satisfy growing demand, the STO purchased additional second-hand buses from the Société de transport de Montréal, Société de transport de Laval, Société de transport de Sherbrooke and OC Transpo. They all have since been retired.

The STO introduced its first fleet of low-floor buses from NovaBus in 2002, and it has only such buses since then. The following year, the STO  announced plans to build a bus-only roadway called the Rapibus. The project was initially expected to be completed by 2009, but it was finally opened in 2013.

In 2005, the STO announced a strategic plan for 2002-2015 in which it projected a ridership of 96 million by 2019 up from 2.4 million in 1992. Ridership from 1995 to 2006 had grown about 50%. In addition to the Rapibus, the STO planned to increase the number of park and ride facilities across the city as well as introduce bike racks, expand or add garages, and expand the fleet.

In 2012, it introduced its fleet of Novabus LFS articulated buses and the following year, it unveiled their new visual identity – L'avenir en commun (in English: the future together) as well as a new logo.

In 2013, STO launched a new bus rapid transit (BRT) system called Rapibus, which includes a dedicated 12-kilometre corridor that runs from Labrosse Boulevard to Alexandre-Taché Boulevard.

In 2015, the STO buys 10 Classics from Calgary Transit, the last buses to be purchased second-hand from another company.

In February 2020, the last Classic bus (#9225 an ex-Calgary Transit unit) retired, marking an end to the iconic bus model of the STO which span for more than four decades.

Starting June 2021, STO buses were re-routed from Wellington and Rideau Street in Ottawa to Albert and Slater Streets.

Operations
According to its 2014 annual report, STO employed a total of 780 employees, of which 479 were drivers. It also has a total of 345 buses, 70 routes and 284 shelters. Its ridership in 2014 was approx. 19.8 million, a slight decrease from previous years. Similar to other cities, it also paratransit service (about 60 vehicles of various sizes) as well as Park-n-Ride service (23 locations as of 2014).

Fleet

Since 2002, Novabus LFS's have been purchased annually to replace older vehicles and to expand the fleet over time. All generations have been purchased except the first generation as OC Transpo (its sister company) have found its first generation Novabus LFS's to be unreliable.

Accessibility
The STO planned to convert half of its total bus fleet into low-floor, LFS model  NovaBus by 2012,.  Unfortunately, the more recent models had a decreased seating capacity (room for 87 rather than 40). Another issue that was discovered with this model were the unreliable telescopic ramps that prevented wheelchair access to the bus. As of 1988, the fleet had wheelchair accessible buses. These were of the 1995 first-generation LFS's, which have the more reusable flick-out rooms. Aside from these planes, wheelchair users rely on the paratransit service.

Technology
A number of significant technology improvements and studies have been made over the past few decades by the STO. In 1998, The company introduced a smart-card fare system, making it the first company not only in the Americas but the entire Western Hemisphere to have a smart-card system. Paper card bus passes were gradually phased out until its official end in 2004 when smart cards became the exclusive bus pass.

In 2006–07, fishbowl buses had their rollsigns replaced with LED signs. In 2002 and again in 2007, the STO tested new hybrid buses for feasibility. During the summer of 2008, the STO has started a test trial of a prototype New Flyer articulated bus on several of its routes. The bus has 58 seats and a total capacity of 115 passengers.

In 2014, STO added wi-fi to several of its lines, including all buses and stations associated with rapibus. In 2015, STO announced plans to introduce the bus planning App called Plani-Bus

Future Growth
After the opening of OC Transpo's Line 1 Confederation. The Slater and Albert Streets became vacant of OC Transpo buses as the Transitway has been replaced by the LRT, allowing the STO to move buses off Wellington and Rideau Streets onto Albert and Slater on a future date.

STO is deciding on future transit needs will be mixed rapid transit (bus rapid transit and light rail) or light rail only. The plan is unclear how STO rail line will connect with OCTranspo's light O-Train rail line.

See also
 OC Transpo
 Public transport in Canada

References

External links
 Société de transport de l'Outaouais (STO) Home Page
 STO network map
 Peter McLaughlin's STO photo page
 Barp.ca's STO bus gallery

Outaouais
Outaouais
Transport in Gatineau
Bus transport in Ottawa
Outaouais
Outaouais
Transport in Outaouais
Canadian companies established in 1971
1971 establishments in Quebec